Anna Margaret Mollenhauer (born 18 September 1999) is a field hockey player from Canada, who plays as a midfielder.

Personal life
Anna Mollenhauer was born and raised in Victoria, British Columbia. Her mother, Nancy, was also a Canadian international field hockey player.

Mollenhauer is a student at the University of Victoria.

Career

Junior national team
In 2021, Mollenhauer made her debut for the Canada U–21 team at the Pan American Junior Championship in Santiago. She won a gold medal at the tournament, scoring the winning goal in the final.

Senior national team
Mollenhauer made her debut for the Canadian senior team in 2019, during a test series against China in Panzhihua. 2019 proved to be a successful year for Mollenhauer, as she won silver medals at both the FIH Series Finals in Valencia, and the Pan American Games in Lima.

References

External links
 
 
 

1999 births
Living people
Canadian female field hockey players
Female field hockey midfielders
Field hockey players from Victoria, British Columbia
Pan American Games silver medalists for Canada
Pan American Games medalists in field hockey
Field hockey players at the 2019 Pan American Games
Medalists at the 2019 Pan American Games